Zafer Ergin (born 30 August 1942) is a Turkish actor who plays in Arka Sokaklar.

Filmography
 Sümela'nın Şifresi: Temel – 2011
 Akasya Durağı – 2008 (guest appearance)
 New York'ta Beş Minare – 2010 
 Güneşi Gördüm – 2009 
 Ankara Cinayeti – 2006 
 Arka Sokaklar – 2006–2022 – Rıza Soylu
 Büyük Buluşma – 2006 – Eren 
 Döngel Karhanesi – 2005 – TMSF President
 Kanlı Düğün – 2005 – Cemal Bey
 Zalim – 2003 – Şanlı Bey 
 Kurtlar Vadisi – 2003–2005 – Mehmet Karahanlı
 Hırsız – 2001 
 Deli Yürek: Bumerang Cehennemi – 2001 – Şeref
 Sir Dosyasi – 1999
 Berlin in Berlin – 1993 
 Bir Tren Yolculuğu – 1988 
 Yaprak Dökümü – 1987 
 Çalıkuşu – 1986 
 Bağdat Hatun – 1981

References

External links

1942 births
Living people
Male actors from Ankara
Turkish male film actors
Turkish male television actors
20th-century Turkish male actors